The Gießgraben (also: Gießbach or Krampugraben) is a river of Lower Austria.

The Gießgraben originates below Hohenwarth and flows in southern direction into an old branch of the Danube near Utzenlaa, Königsbrunn am Wagram.

References

Rivers of Lower Austria
Rivers of Austria